The Arthrostylidiinae is a subtribe of bamboo (tribe Bambuseae of the family Poaceae). It comprises 15 genera. The plant grows in tropical regions.

References

Bambusoideae
Plant subtribes